Sarah the Teen Princess is a Philippine television musical drama that aired on ABS-CBN from March 1 to October 22, 2004.

Cast and characters

Main cast 
 Sarah Geronimo as Sarah Alagao
 Mark Bautista as Baste Dimaguiba

Supporting cast 
 Jill Yulo as Alice
 Mikel Campos as Cedrick
 Eliza Pineda as Belle
 Ben Deatha
 Aiza Maequez
 Jaime Fabregas
 Gloria Diaz
 Celine Lirio
 Nonie Buencamino
 Alwyn Uytingco as Andrei
 Christian Bautista as Christian Leynes

See also 
 List of programs broadcast by ABS-CBN
 List of telenovelas of ABS-CBN

External links 
 

ABS-CBN drama series
2004 Philippine television series debuts
2004 Philippine television series endings
Philippine musical television series
Filipino-language television shows
Television series about teenagers
Television shows set in Quezon City